5,12-Bis(phenylethynyl)naphthacene is a fluorescent dye used in lightsticks. It yields orange light.

See also
9,10-bis(phenylethynyl)anthracene

References

Fluorescent dyes
Polycyclic aromatic hydrocarbons
Organic semiconductors
Alkyne derivatives